Atiak is a town in the Northern Region of Uganda on the Gulu-Nimule Road, the primary trade route between Uganda and South Sudan.

Location
Atiak is in Kilak County the Amuru District. The coordinates of the town are 3°15'33.0"N, 32°07'23.0"E (Latitude:3.259167; Longitude:32.123056).

History
Atiak was the site of the 20 April 1995 Atiak massacre in which the Lord's Resistance Army executed an estimated 300 civilian men and abducted juveniles.

Points of interest
The following additional points of interest lie within the town or close to its borders:

 offices of Atiak Town Council
 Atiak central market
 Gulu–Nimule Road, passing through the center of town in a general north/south direction.
 Atiak–Adjumani–Moyo–Afoji Road joins the Gulu–Nimule Road in the middle of town.
 Atyak Chiefdom Headquarters (Ker Kwaro Atyak)
 Tamarind Tree planted by Rwot Olya (1885 to 1923)

See also
 List of cities and towns in Uganda
 List of roads in Uganda

References

External links
The Roots of War: Atiak Massacre, New Wave of LRA Brutality

Amuru District
Populated places in Northern Region, Uganda
Cities in the Great Rift Valley